Taherabad (also Romanized as Ţāherābād) is a village in taherabad Rural District, Hati District, Lali County, Khuzestan Province, Iran. At the 2006 census, its population was 176, in 33 families.

References 

Populated places in Lali County